Misripara Seema Buddha Bihar is a Buddhist temple located at Misripara village of Latachapli Union Parishad in Patuakhali District. Though it's a place of worship for Buddhists, it has become a tourist spot for many tourists who come to visit the kuakata sea beach. This temple has a big statue of Gautama Buddha, and is locally known as Misripara Buddha Mandir. It is four kilometers away from Kuakata Buddhist Temple.

References

Buddhist temples in Bangladesh